Matt Squire (born May 7, 1976) is an American record producer, audio engineer, mixing engineer, and songwriter. His production, songwriting, and mixing credits include Underoath, Panic! at the Disco, Ariana Grande, Demi Lovato, Selena Gomez, Kesha, One Direction, Bea Miller, Krewella, Sum 41, Simple Plan, All Time Low, Good Charlotte, 3OH!3, Boys Like Girls, The Amity Affliction, The Used, and Taking Back Sunday.

Early years
Matt Squire was born in Washington, D.C. on May 7, 1976 to John Squire and Lynn Zwerin. He was drawn to music at an early age. He got his first guitar at age 8 and he taught himself how to play drums at age 10. Squire attended high school at Georgetown Day School and graduated in 1994. He went on to attend Boston University and graduated in 1999.

Prior to producing, Squire was in numerous bands. He was in Ashes, Miltown, The Dubnicks, Long Distance Runner, and The Rise Park. After The Rise Park folded, Squire recorded some demos for The Explosion. Soon after that, he went on to work with producer Paul Q. Kolderie after Kolderie reopened Fort Apache Studio in Boston under the name Camp Street Studio. In late 2004, Squire moved to the Washington, D.C. area to open up SOMD studio in College Park, Maryland. After moving back to the Washington area, Squire was re-introduced to Alexandra (Ali) Mackler. Squire and Mackler went to the same high school and university. Prior to his May 2007 marriage, Squire moved into a new home down the road from College Park and reopened SOMD studio in his home. After years of success in Maryland, Squire moved to Los Angeles. Currently, Squire maintains SOMD studio in Maryland and also works out of Los Angeles.

Career
Matt Squire is known for producing and writing pop and rock music. He has a knack for discovering underground artists and helping them refine their sound. Squire works very closely with his artists. He is known as a hands-on producer who often makes lyrical and musical suggestions. He also co-writes with artists and writers.

In addition, he worked on season one and two of the American version of The X Factor.

In 2015, Matt Squire joined the judging panel for The 14th Annual Independent Music Awards.

Squire is best known for his work with acts including: Demi Lovato, All Time Low, Panic! At The Disco and Ariana Grande. More recently, he's worked with Tampa-based post-hardcore act, Underøath, on their first effort in eight years, Erase Me and Australian metalcore band, The Amity Affliction, on their album Misery.

In 2018, Squire entered the studio with The Maine, to record the band's follow up to Lovely, Little, Lonely and first collaboration with Squire in ten years.

Selected discography
w - writer, p - producer, m - mixed, e - engineered, d - digital editing, ma - mastered

Albums 

 3OH!3 - Streets of Gold (w/p/e)
 3OH!3 - Want (p/m/e)
All Time Low - Dirty Work (w/p)
 All Time Low - Nothing Personal (w/p/e)*
 All Time Low - So Wrong, It's Right (w/p/m/e)
The Amity Affliction - Misery (w/p)
 The Amity Affliction - Everyone Loves You... Once You Leave Them (p,e)
 Ariana Grande - Yours Truly (c-w/c-p)*
 Big Time Rush - Windows Down (w/p)
 Bleeder Resistor - 16 (p/m/e)
 Boys Like Girls - Boys Like Girls (p/m/e)
 Breathe Carolina - Hello Fascination (p/m/e)*
 Cute Is What We Aim For - The Same Old Blood Rush with a New Touch (p/m/e)
David Archuleta - “The Other Side of Down” (p)
 Forever The Sickest Kids - The Weekend: Friday (p)
 Good Charlotte - Cardiology (w)*
Have Mercy - The Love Life (p)
 Hit The Lights - This Is a Stick Up... Don't Make It a Murder (p/m/e)
 Hollywood Undead - Day of the Dead (w/p)*
 Monty Are I - Wall of People (p/m/e)
 Monty Are I - Break Through the Silence (p/e)
Neck Deep - All Distortions Are Intentional (p/e)
 Northstar - Pollyanna (p/m/e)
Panic! at the Disco - A Fever You Can't Sweat Out (p/m/e)
 People In Planes - Beyond The Horizon (p/e)
 Plain White T's - Parallel Universe (w/p)
 Saosin - In Search of Solid Ground (w)*
 Simple Plan - Get Your Heart On (w)*
 Skindred - Roots Rock Riot (p)
 So They Say - Antidote for Irony (p/e)
 Taking Back Sunday - New Again (p/e)*
The Almost - Fear Caller (p)
 The Cab - Whisper War (p/m/e)
 The Junior Varsity - Wide Eyed (e)
The Maine - Can't Stop Won't Stop (p/m/e)
 The Maine - You Are OK (p/e)
 The Receiving End of Sirens - Between the Heart and the Synapse (p)
 The Receiving End of Sirens - The Earth Sings Mi Fa Mi (p/m/e)
 The Receiving End of Sirens - The Receiving End of Sirens EP (p/e)
The Static Age - Neon Nights Electric Lives (p/m/e)
 The Used - Artwork (p/e)
Toothgrinder - I AM (w/p/m/e)
Underoath - Erase Me (p)
Youngblood Hawke - Wake Up (w/p)*
 Youngblood Hawke - We Come Running (w/p)

Singles 

 3OH!3 ft. Katy Perry - "Starstrukk" (p/e)
 Against The Current - "that won't save us" (w/p/e)
 Ariana Grande - "Put Your Hearts Up" (w/p)
 Bea Miller - "Rich Kids" (w/p)
 Bea Miller - "This Is Not An Apology" (w/p)
 Big Time Rush - "Paralyzed" from Elevate (w)
Demi Lovato - "Without The Love" (c-w/p)
 Dreamers - "To The Fire" (c-w/a-p)
 David Archuleta - “Parachutes and Airplanes” (w)
 David Cook - “4 Letter Word” (w)
 Greyson Chance - "Heart Like Stone" (p)
 Hollywood Undead - "War Child" (c-p)
 Katy Perry - "I Kissed a Girl" (rock mix)
 Kesha - "Dirty Love" (c-w/c-p)
 Krewella - "Somewhere To Run" (p)
 Mowgli's - "Make It Right" (w)
 One Direction - "Up All Night" and "Na Na Na" (w/p)
 Sabrina Carpenter -  "White Flag" (w/p)
 Selena Gomez - "Sick of You" (w/p)
 Sum 41 - "Baby You Don't Wanna Know" (w)
 Sum 41 - "Twisted By Design" (c-w)
 The Ghost Club - "This Bird Has Flown" (p)
 The Ghost Club - "Hey There Rose" (p)
 The Ready Set - "More Than Alive" (w)
 Will Wood - “Love, Me Normally” (p)

* select tracks

Accomplishments

Awards
Nominated for Boston Music Award 2007

References

External links

Twitter
Interview with AbsolutePunk
"Chairmen of the boards" article from The Phoenix

Record producers from Washington, D.C.
Boston University alumni
Living people
Mixing engineers
1976 births
Battery (hardcore punk band) members
Miltown (band) members
Georgetown Day School alumni